Hanna Németh (born 17 September 1998) is a Hungarian footballer who plays as a defender for Frauen-Bundesliga club Werder Bremen and the Hungary women's national team.

References

1998 births
Living people
Sportspeople from Pest County
Hungarian women's footballers
Women's association football defenders
Hungary women's international footballers
Ferencvárosi TC (women) footballers
Indiana Hoosiers women's soccer players
SV Werder Bremen (women) players
Hungarian expatriate footballers
Hungarian expatriate sportspeople in the United States
Expatriate women's soccer players in the United States
Hungarian expatriate sportspeople in Germany
Expatriate women's footballers in Germany
Hungarian women's futsal players